The Caproni Ca.7 was a proposed biplane designed by Caproni in the early 1910s.

Design
The Ca.7 was an all-wood biplane equipped with a double horizontal fletching system, mounted respectively at the front and rear ends of the fuselage . The project involved the installation of two "tandem" engines inside the fuselage, which would have to accommodate, in addition to the pilot (housed at the front end, just behind the bow landing), two passengers (seated behind the engines).

The aircraft had two pushing propellers, driven by chain drive devices from the engines housed in the fuselage; the two engines were connected by friction clutches, so that they could work together or separately. Precisely because of the design difficulties involved in the use of two engines, both housed in the fuselage, one at a time should have been turned off, even in flight, for cooling needs, but prevented the construction of the airplane, which therefore he remained at the project stage.

Although, the Ca.7 never left the drawing board, its design contributed to the development of the multiengine Caproni bombers of World War I.

Specifications

See also 
 Giovanni Battista Caproni

References

Ca.007
Experimental aircraft